Terry Elijah Larrier (born August 15, 1995) is an American professional basketball player who last played for CSO Voluntari of the Liga Națională. He played college basketball for the VCU Rams and the UConn Huskies.

College career
Larrier first played college basketball with the VCU Rams, then departed after the 2014–15 season to join the Connecticut Huskies. Due to NCAA regulations, Larrier redshirted during the Huskies' 2015–16 season. He then injured his left knee and tore his ACL four games into the 2016–17 season.

Larrier began his senior season with a 27-point game but missed four games with a nasal fracture that required surgery. He posted 13.9 points and 4.8 rebounds per game as a senior. After the 2017–18 season, Larrier announced he would forgo his college eligibility, and enter the 2018 NBA draft. He graduated with a degree in urban and community studies.

Professional career
After going undrafted in the 2018 NBA Draft. he joined the Memphis Grizzlies for the NBA Summer League. Larrier signed a training camp contract with the Dallas Mavericks on July 31, 2018. He was waived on August 9, 2018, after suffering an ankle injury. On June 26, 2019, Larrier was listed in the roster of San Antonio Spurs for 2019 NBA Summer League hosted at Vivint Smart Home Arena.

For the 2019–20 season, Larrier signed with the Agua Caliente Clippers of the NBA G League. He injured his ankle on January 23, 2020, ending his season. Larrier averaged 7.6 points and 2.3 rebounds per game.

On August 11, 2020, Larrier signed with the Norrköping Dolphins of the Swedish league. In his debut, he contributed 26 points and 5 rebounds in an 83–77 win against BC Luleå. Larrier averaged 17 points and 5 rebounds per game. 

On July 14, 2021, Larrier signed with Stal Ostrów Wielkopolski of the Polish Basketball League, but did not appear in a game for the club. 

In October 2021, he joined the Wisconsin Herd after being acquired in a trade. Larrier was removed from the team on February 2, 2022. On February 10, 2022, Larrier was reacquired by the Wisconsin Herd of the NBA G League.

On August 2, 2022, he has signed with CSO Voluntari of the Liga Națională.

References

External links
UConn Huskies bio

1995 births
Living people
Agua Caliente Clippers players
American men's basketball players
American expatriate basketball people in Sweden
Basketball players from New York City
CSO Voluntari players
Forwards (basketball)
Sportspeople from the Bronx
UConn Huskies men's basketball players
VCU Rams men's basketball players
Wisconsin Herd players